Henri Karel Frederik van Teijn (28 February 1839, Dussen - 24 June 1892, Utrecht) was a Dutch general, knight and officer in the Military William Order, civil and military governor of Aceh and Dependencies.

Military decorations
  Knight third class of the Military William Order
  Knight of the Order of the Netherlands Lion
  Expedition Cross with clasp "Aceh 1876-96"
  Medal for Long, Honest and Faithful Service with the figure XXX

Sources
1889. Egbert Broer Kielstra. Generaal-majoor H.K.F. van Teijn. Civiel -en Militair Gouverneur van Atjeh en Onderhorigheden. Eigen Haard. Bladzijde 428-430.
1903. G. van Steyn. Gedenkboek KMA. P.B. Nieuwenhuijs. Breda.

1839 births
1892 deaths
Aceh War
Dutch colonial governors and administrators
Royal Netherlands East Indies Army generals
Royal Netherlands East Indies Army officers
Knights Third Class of the Military Order of William
People from Dussen